The Studebaker Light Four was an automobile produced by the Studebaker Corporation of South Bend, Indiana in 1918 and 1919. The car was officially designated Model SH Series 19 and available as a touring car, sedan and roadster.

The Light Four rode a  wheelbase, and was powered by Studebaker's side-valve inline  four-cylinder engine, delivering  at 2,000 rpm. It shared the chassis and length with the Studebaker Light Six.

The Light Four was dropped in 1920 as Studebaker shifted its model range to the more popular Light Six, Special Six and the Big Six.

Because of its low production numbers, the Light Four is considered to be a rare model by Studebaker collectors of this era of automobile. Retail prices started from US$1,125 to $1,685 ($ to $ in  dollars).

References

Light Four